The Soundarya Lahari meaning "The waves of Beauty" is a famous literary work in Sanskrit attributed to Adi Shankara. Some believe the first part "Ananda Lahari" was etched on mount Meru by Ganesha himself (or by Pushpadanta). Sage Gaudapada, the teacher of Shankar's teacher Govinda Bhagavadpada, memorised the writings of Pushpadanta which was carried down to Adi Shankara.
Its hundred and three shlokas (verses) praise the beauty, grace and munificence of Goddess Tripura Sundari as Goddess Parvati. W. Norman Brown translated it to English which was published as volume 43 of the Harvard Oriental Series in 1958.

History
Saundarya Lahari was composed in Kashmir.

Tantra "textbook"
The Saundarya Lahari is not only a collection of holy hymns, but also a tantra textbook, giving instructions on Puja, Sri-Yantra and worshiping methods,  100 different hymns, 100 different yantra, almost one to each shloka; it describes the appropriate tantra method of performing devotion connected to each specific shloka; and details the results ensuring therefrom. There are many interpretations and commentaries but best of these are arguably those that provide word-to-word translations, as also the yantra, the devotion to be performed and the results of the devotion.

Two parts

It is once said that Adi Shankara visited Kailash to worship Shiva and Parvati. There, the Lord gave him a manuscript containing 100 verses which described the many facets of the Goddess, as a gift to him. While Shankara was returning after visiting Kailash, Nandi stopped him on the way. He snatched the manuscript from him, tore it into two, took one part and gave the other to Shankara. Shankara, desolate, ran to Shiva and narrated the incident to him. Shiva, smiling, commanded him to retain the 41 verses with him as the initial part of the 100 verses and then, write an extra 59 verses in praise of the Goddess himself. Thus, verses 1–41 are the original work of Lord Shiva, shedding great light on the ancient rituals of Tantra, Yantra and various powerful Mantra.
Verses 1–41 describe the mystical experience of the union of Shiva and Shakti and related phenomena. In fact, it opens with the assertion that Only when Shiva is united with Shakti does he have the power to create( to manifest ). 

The remaining verses, that is, 42–100 are composed by Adi Shankara himself, which mainly focuses on the appearance of the Goddess. All the 100 verses are collectively known as 'Soundarya Lahari'.
The Soundarya Lahari is not only a poem. It is a tantra textbook, giving instructions on Puja and offerings, many yantra, almost one to each shloka; describing the tantra technique of performing devotion connected to each specific shloka; and details the results ensuing therefrom. There are many interpretations and commentaries but best of these are arguably those that provide word-to-word translations, as also the yantra, the devotion to be performed and the results of the devotion.

Verses 42–100 are more straightforward; they describe the physical beauty of the Goddess and are sometimes referred to as the Soundarya Lahari itself.

Many scholars, however, refer to the entire text with one name, namely, Soundarya Lahari.

Concept of Kundalini
First 41 verses cover the detailed account of internal worship of the Mother. It consists of systematic exposition of the concept of kundalini, Sri Chakra, mantra (verses 32, 33). This depicts the Supreme Reality as non-dual but with a distinction between Shiva and Shakti, the power holder and Power, Being and Will.  The Power, that is, the Mother or Maha Tripura Sundari, becomes the dominant factor and the power holder or Shiva becomes a substratum. The first verse itself clearly describes this idea. "United with Shakti, Shiva is endowed with power to create; or otherwise, he is incapable of even a movement." The same idea is brought out in verse 24, "Brahma creates the universe, Vishnu sustains, Rudra destroys, and Maheshwar absorbs every thing and assimilates into Sadashiva. On receiving mandate from thy creeper like brows, Sadasiva restores everything into activity as in the previous cycle." Such prominence of the Mother can be seen in verses 34 and 35 also.

Legend
There are several legends about this work. One legend says that, once Adi Shankara visited Kailash to worship Shiva and Parvati. There, the Lord gave him a manuscript containing 100 verses which described the many facets of the Goddess, as a gift to him. While Shankara was returning after visiting Kailash, Nandi stopped him on the way. He snatched the manuscript from him, tore it into two, took one part and gave the other to Shankara. Shankara, desolate, ran to Shiva and narrated the incident to him. Shiva, smilingly, commanded him to retain the 41 verses with him as the initial part of the 100 verses and then, write an extra 59 verses in praise of the Goddess himself. Thus, verses 1–41 are the original work of Lord Shiva, shedding great light on the ancient rituals of Tantra, Yantra and various powerful Mantra. The remaining verses, that is, 42–100 are composed by Adi Shankara himself, which mainly focuses on the appearance of the Goddess. Yet another legend says that once when Adi Shankara was visiting Kailash, Lord Shiva was writing about the beauty of Goddess Parvati on the walls of their home. Shiva rubbed what he wrote as he didn't want Adi Shankara who was an outsider reading about the beauty of his wife. But Adi Shankara had seen some part of the writings and with his superior mind recollected the rest. Thus, he composed the Soundarya Lahari (waves of beauty of the Devi).

Commentaries
There are more than 36 commentaries on the Soundarya Lahari in Sanskrit itself. Among the better known are commentaries by Lakshmidhara, Kameshvarasuri (viz. Arunamodini), Kaivalyashrama (viz. Sowbagyavardhini) and Dindima.

Translations
Saundarya Lahari was translated into Tamil in the 12th century by Virai Kaviraja Pandithar. He titled the book Abhirami Paadal.

There are many English translations with commentaries on Soundarya Lahari done by various authors.
 Pandit S. Subrahmanya Sastri and T.R Srinivasa Ayyangar
 Swami Tapasyananda of Sri Ramakrishna Math
 Swami Satyasangananda Saraswathi (of Bihar School of Yoga) has authored a modern commentary with Sri Vidya meditations on Devi for each verse
 Mani Rao, "Saundarya Lahari" HarperCollins 2022.

See also
Adi Shankara bibliography
 Shivananda Lahari

References

Hindu texts
Sanskrit texts
8th-century works
Tantra
Adi Shankara
Advaita Vedanta texts